Abralia grimpei is a species of enoploteuthid cephalopod known from the western North Atlantic Ocean, including the West Indies and the Sargasso Sea. It is recognizable from other Abralia species by the extra photophores on its eyes.

References

Abralia
Molluscs described in 1959